The Recessive Pied budgerigar mutation is one of approximately 30 mutations affecting the colour of budgerigars.  It is the underlying mutation of the Danish Pied variety, aka Harlequin.  It is believed by Inte Onsman of MUTAVI to be the same mutation as the Anti-dimorphic Pied (ADM Pied) found in some parrots.  The Dark-eyed Clear variety results when the Recessive Pied and Clearflight Pied characters are combined.

Appearance
All pied budgerigars are characterised by having irregular patches of completely clear feathers appearing anywhere in the body, head or wings.  Such patches are devoid of the black melanin pigment and show just the ground colour—yellow in green-series birds and white in blue-series.  The remainder of the body is coloured normally.  In the Recessive Pied the clear areas are very extensive and many Recessive Pieds are predominantly clear with quite small irregularly shaped areas of normal pigmentation.  Although normally coloured, these areas seem to carry a heightened brilliance which is particularly attractive in the stronger colours such as Cobalt, Violet and Dark Green.  As with all pieds, there is a large variation in the position and extent of the variegated patches, but the typical striations are almost always present around the eyes.  In general, hens are more heavily marked on the wings than cocks.

Genetics
There is no universally accepted genetic symbol for either the locus or mutant allele, so the simple symbol r+ for 'recessive' will be adopted here for the wild-type allele at this locus, and the symbol r for the Recessive Pied mutant allele, in keeping with the symbol used by Taylor and Warner and Martin.

The factors governing the distribution of the residual pigmentation are not known.

Notes

References

External links
 World Budgerigar Organisation (WBO)
 MUTAVI

budgerigar colour mutations